Iphiothe is a genus of beetles in the family Cerambycidae, first described by Francis Pascoe in 1866.

Species 
Iphiothe contains the following species:

 Iphiothe borneana (Breuning, 1976)
 Iphiothe criopsioides Pascoe, 1866
 Iphiothe malaccensis Miroshnikov, 2019
 Iphiothe pascoei Miroshnikov & Heffern, 2020

References

Lamiini